Fazal Ahmed (born 1941) is a Rohingya lawyer and former politician in Myanmar. He was a leader of the National Democratic Party for Human Rights (NDPHR). He was elected as Parliament of Myanmar MP during the 1990 Burmese general election.

Early life
Ahmed was born in 1941 in the Basuba village of Maungdaw in Arakan Division of British Burma. His father was Mohammed Kalu. He attended the State High School of Maungdaw. After finishing his high school education, in 1960, he joined to Deputy Commissioner’s Office in Maungdaw as a clerk and he served in various offices in Maungdaw, Buthidaung, Kyauk Taw, Kaukpyu, Taungup, and Sittwe in Arakan State. Later he passed the higher grade pleader (HGP) examination and he started working as a private lawyer. He also worked in the office of the Deputy Commissioner in Maungdaw.

Political career
Ahmed was a member of the Central Executive Committee of the NDPHR. Ahmed contested the 1990 general election from Maungdaw-2 constituency. He won the election with a mandate of 24,833 votes out of 58,230 votes. He was one of the four NDPHR MPs in the Burmese parliament.

Detention
The Burmese military junta banned NDPHR in 1992. Ahmed was arrested and tortured.

See also
Rohingya people

References

Rohingya politicians
Burmese Muslims
People from Maungdaw
1941 births
Living people